Gertrude Maretta Paul (6 September 1934 – 7 January 1992) was a teacher and advocate for the British Caribbean community in Yorkshire.

Biography 
Paul was born in 1934 in Parson's Ground Village on the Caribbean island Saint Kitt's, and moved to Leeds, England in 1956. She was one of eleven children. Despite having been awarded a teaching training qualification in Antigua, when she arrived in England she was required to complete a British training course, which she did at the James Graham College of Education (now part of Leeds Beckett University) and graduated in the early 1960s.

Paul was the first black teacher in Leeds. In 1976 she became the first black headteacher in the city, running Elmhurst Middle School (later known as Bracken Edge Primary School). A community builder, she was one of the founders of the Leeds West Indian Carnival, which is one of the longest running West Indian carnivals in Europe and the longest running in the UK. She was a co-founder and President of the United Caribbean Association in Leeds, and also served on the UK government's Commission for Racial Equality.

She died in January 1992, of a heart attack, in Saint Kitts.

Legacy 
A blue plaque commemorates her at the school she worked at, Elmhurst Middle School, now Bracken Edge Primary, unveiled in 2011 by Leeds Civic Trust. Paul was nominated for the plaque by members of Chapeltown Heritage Trust.

In May 2020 Leeds Beckett University launched the Gertrude Paul Doctoral Studentship, which will enable research into how numeracy and literacy can be improved for primary school children from African and Caribbean backgrounds.

References

External links 

 Women Of Leeds: Gertrude Paul The Inspirational Head Teacher – Welcome to Leeds

1992 deaths
Heads of schools in Yorkshire
1934 births
Saint Kitts and Nevis emigrants to the United Kingdom
Leeds Blue Plaques